The Sucumbíos Triangle is a territorial zone in Ecuador, located between the Putumayo river to the north and San Miguel river to the south. It belonged to Peru as a de jure international exclave between 1922 and 1942, until it was ceded to Ecuador after the Rio de Janeiro Protocol of 1942, forming today part of its border with Colombia.

History
After the signing of the Salomón-Lozano Treaty in 1922, Colombia and Peru officially established their borders and exchanged strategic territories: Colombia obtained an entrance to the Amazon River through the Amazon Trapeze, while Peru de jure obtained a strategic exclave between the Putumayo and San Miguel rivers. Despite having ceded the territory to Colombia in 1916, the act was not recognized by the Ecuadorian government, however, since both signatory countries also had territorial disputes with Ecuador.

After the Leticia incident of 1932 and the Colombian–Peruvian War, the Protocol of Rio de Janeiro of 1934 was negotiated, where Colombia and Peru smoothed over the rough edges and both agreed that the borders would remain as agreed in 1922. Colombia made it clear to Peru that it recognized Peruvian sovereignty over the Sucumbíos triangle, although Peru up to that moment had not carried out serious colonization operations on its exclave.

In 1933, after the failure of the only serious attempt to colonize the triangle, taking advantage of the end of the Colombian-Peruvian war and in the lapse of the signing of the 1934 protocol, the Peruvian diplomats Víctor Manuel Maúrtua, Víctor Andrés Belaúnde, Alberto Ulloa Sotomayor and Raúl Porras Barrenechea tried to reach an agreement with their Colombian counterparts, so that the Sucumbíos triangle would return to Colombian sovereignty and the Amazon trapeze to Peruvian sovereignty, this did not happen, however, and Peru continued to possess the uncontrolled territory.

Rio de Janeiro Protocol
Peru and Ecuador still maintained a territorial conflict that escalated with the Ecuadorian–Peruvian War of 1941. During the conflict Ecuador maintained control of the Sucumbíos triangle, as well as the territories on its side of the de facto border of 1936. During the negotiations after the war for the Rio de Janeiro Protocol, Peru granted the triangle to Ecuador, in addition to other territorial claims in the upper Napo River, in exchange for other territories, as well as recognition of Peruvian sovereignty in Tumbes, Jaén and Maynas. The oil-rich region proved extremely beneficial to Ecuador in the long run, as it contributed to its economy and a national reconstruction program started after the war.

See also
 Amazon Trapeze
 Ecuadorian–Peruvian territorial dispute
 Ecuador–Peru border

Notes

References

States and territories established in 1922
States and territories disestablished in 1942
Borders of Peru
Borders of Ecuador
Borders of Colombia
Ecuadorian–Peruvian War